Wero Tāroi (c.1810–1880), also known as Wero Mahikore and Karu, was a notable New Zealand Māori carver of the Ngāti Tarāwhai iwi. He was born at Lake Okataina, in the Rotorua district in New Zealand, and active from about 1860. Wero's works include Te Puawai o Te Arawa (the pātaka or storehouse at Auckland Museum), and storehouses such as Tiki-o-Tamamutu at Taupō, Te Puawai-o-Te-Arawa at Maketū, and Tokopikowhakahau at Tāpapa.

References

1880 deaths
New Zealand Māori carvers
Ngāti Tarāwhai people
Te Arawa people
Year of birth unknown
Year of birth uncertain